Jan Kalenec (1490–1546) was a Prague cutler who took up the leadership of the Amosites, a radical branch of the Czech Brethren after the death of their elderly figurehead Amos. They were known as the malá stránka, "small party" or "minor unity," of the brethren.

References

Czech Protestants
1490 births
1546 deaths